An obturator hernia is a rare type of hernia of the pelvic floor in which pelvic or abdominal contents protrudes through the obturator foramen. Because of differences in anatomy, it is much more common in women, especially multiparous and older women who have recently lost much weight. The diagnosis is often made intraoperatively after presenting with bowel obstruction.

The Howship–Romberg sign is suggestive of an obturator hernia, exacerbated by thigh extension, medial rotation and abduction. It is characterized by lancinating pain in the medial thigh/obturator distribution, extending to the knee; caused by hernia compression of the obturator nerve.

References

External links 

Hernias